Smriti "Simi" Mehra (born 21 May 1972) is the first woman from India to become a member of the world's leading golf tour for women, the US-based LPGA Tour. She is recognized as "a pioneer and a pillar for women's golf in India." She was born in Kolkata, and attended University of Calcutta before turning professional in 1994.

Mehra won once on the second tier Futures Tour in 1996 to win promotion to the main LPGA Tour, which she played from 1997–1999, and from 2001-2004. She underwent shoulder surgery in 2005 and played on the Futures Tour in 2006 in the hope of regaining her place at the top level.

In October 2005, Mehra played LPGA Tour golfers Heather Daly-Donofrio, Hilary Lunke and Celeste Troche in the first Women's Professional Skins Game in India to demonstrate top level women's golf in her home country. 

In 2012, Mehra was named the "Player of the Year" at the Hero-WGAI awards function. She was credited with being part of the team that stabilised the women's pro tour. She played in all 15 events and won seven of them.

In addition to her own athletic accomplishments, Mehra impacted the golf world by co-founding the Women's Golf Association of India in order to offer Indian women golfers the opportunity to make golf a career.

Personal
Mehra learned to play golf at the Royal Calcutta Golf Club, inspired by her mother, Billy, who had been a leading amateur golfer in Southeast Asia. Mehra spends her free time teaching disadvantaged children through the Golf Foundation of India.

Amateur wins
1993 Malaysian National Championship
1994 Indian National Match Play Championship, Indian National Stroke Play Championship

Professional wins

Futures Tour wins
1996 Green Mountain National FUTURES Golf Classic
2004 Frye Classic, Hunters Oak FUTURES Golf Classic

Other wins
2002 Malaysian Open

Team appearances
Professional
World Cup (representing India): 2008

References

External links

LPGA.com article about Mehra and Indian golf

Indian female golfers
LPGA Tour golfers
Golfers from West Bengal
University of Calcutta alumni
Sportspeople from Kolkata
Sportswomen from Kolkata
1972 births
Living people
20th-century Indian women